Walsh University is a private Roman Catholic university in North Canton, Ohio. It enrolls approximately 2,700 students and was founded in 1960 by the Brothers of Christian Instruction as a liberal arts college. Walsh College became Walsh University in 1993. The university offers more than 70 undergraduate majors and seven graduate programs, as well as multiple global learning experiences.

History
The school's namesake is Bishop Emmett Michael Walsh of the Roman Catholic Diocese of Youngstown.

Walsh University was founded as LaMennais College in Alfred, Maine in 1951 by the Brothers of Christian Instruction to educate young men as brothers and teachers. In 1957 Brother Francoeur of La Mennais College and Monsignor William Hughes of Youngstown, Ohio discussed the Brothers' wish to move LaMennais College from Alfred, Maine, and Bishop Walsh invited the Brothers to choose Canton, Ohio as the new location. Bishop Walsh donated $304,000 to the Walsh College project. The Founding Brothers include: Dacian J. Barrette, Thomas S. Farrell, Henry J. Vannasse, Edmond Drouin, Paul E. Masse, Robert A. Francoeur, and Alexis Guilbeault. The Brothers have played an active role at the institution, serving as faculty during the original years and playing a part in the growth and development of facilities and programs. Several have served as president.

In 2013, Walsh University joined Division II of the National Collegiate Athletic Association (NCAA). Walsh previously competed in the National Association of Intercollegiate Athletics (NAIA) as a member of the American Mideast Conference, while its football team competed in the Mid-States Football Association.

Presidents 
On July 1, 2019, Walsh University announced that Timothy J. Collins was appointed to serve as the university's seventh president.

Presidents:
 Thomas Farrell - 1960–1970
 Robert Francoeur - 1970–1977
 Francis Blouin - 1978–1992
 Richard Mucowski - 1992–1996
 Kenneth Hamilton - 1997–2001
 Richard Jusseaume - 2002–2019
 Timothy Collins - 2019–present

Campus 

 
Buildings include: 
 Farrell Hall (1960) - This was the first building on campus. Construction started in 1959 and finished in 1960. It was initially named College Hall and was later renamed in honor of Br. Thomas Farrell in 1977, the first president and one of the founding Brothers of Christian Instruction.
 LaMennais Hall (1960) 
 Gaetano M. Cecchini Family Health and Wellness Complex (1971/2009) - Formerly called the Physical Education Center. A major update and renovation occurred in 2009. 
 The Don and Ida Betzler Social and Behavioral Sciences Center (1972) 
 Hannon Child Development Center (1990) 
 Aultman Health Foundation Byers School of Nursing and Health Sciences Center (2000) 
 The Paul and Carol David Family Campus Center (2001) 
 Timken Natural Sciences Center (2005) 
 Barrette Business and Community Center (2005) - The Barrette Business and Community Center is the former site of the Rannou Center (1966-2004) and opened in 2005. 
 Our Lady of Perpetual Help Chapel (2006) 
 Birk Center for the Arts (2012) 
 Saint John Paul II Center for Science Innovation (2015)
 Father Matthew Herttna Counseling Center 
 St. Katharine Drexel House 
 The Marlene and Joe Toot Global Learning Center (2018)
The campus includes dormitory residences named:
 Menard Hall/Betzler Towers (1966/2006) - Menard Hall was the first dormitory on campus and opened in 1966. The Betzler Tower was added in 2006.
 Seanor Hall (1968) - Seanor Hall was initially named Alexis Hall and had been named for Br. Alexis Guilbeaut, one of the Founding Brothers of the university.
 Lemmon Hall (1995) 
 Brauchler Hall (1999), Meier Hall (2000), Stein Hall (2002) - colloquially called "The Grove Apartments" 
 Marie & Ervin Wilkof Towers (2004) 
 Olivieri Family Towers (2007)
 The Commons (2012). 
The Walsh University Peace Pole outside Farrell Hall represents visitors including Willy Brandt, Coretta Scott King, Mother Teresa, and Elie Wiesel who came to Walsh University to advocate for peace.

Walsh also oversees the Hoover Historical Center which they acquired in April 2004.

Academics

Graduate 
Walsh University offers the following graduate degrees: Doctorate of Physical Therapy (DPT); Master of Occupational Therapy (MOT); Master of Science in Nursing (MSN); Master of Arts in Education (M.A.Ed); Master of Business Administration (M.B.A.); Master of Arts in Counseling and Human Development; Master of Arts in Theology, and Doctor of Nursing Practice (DNP). Several graduate programs are offered in online and in an accelerated format.

Undergraduate 
The university offers over 60 majors.

Professional development 
Walsh University offers several opportunities for professional development, including a certificate in healthcare management, FNP certificate, and several educator certificates or licensures.

Athletics 

Walsh has 20 varsity athletic teams, with two more to be added in 2023–24, and competes in the National Collegiate Athletic Association at the Division II level as a member of the Great Midwest Athletic Conference. The university's football team formerly played their home games at Tom Benson Hall of Fame Stadium, now playing on campus at Larry Staut Field.

Varsity teams 
Walsh sponsors 10 men's varsity teams: baseball, basketball, bowling, cross country, football, golf, soccer, lacrosse, tennis, and track & field. The school also sponsors 10 women's varsity teams: basketball, bowling, cross country, golf, lacrosse, soccer, softball, tennis, track & field, and volleyball.

In 2023–24, Walsh will add one new sport for each sex. For men, sprint football will be added. The new team will play in the Midwest Sprint Football League. For women, the cheerleading discipline of STUNT, also not governed by the NCAA, will be added.

Mascot and colors 
The team name is the "Cavaliers" and the athletics teams are represented by Sir Walter the Cavalier at events. Sir Walter also makes appearances at various school events outside of Athletics. A carved replica of Sir Walter stands outside the Cecchini Family Health and Wellness Complex and was created from an oak tree in 2016. The name Cavalier was chosen after the school newspaper, The Spectator, ran a contest in 1963 asking for possible team names. Sean Keenan, Walsh class of 1964, then a junior, submitted for "Cavaliers". He took home a $15 prize.

School colors are maroon and gold.

National championships 
The Women's Basketball Team won the 1998 NAIA National Championship and the men's basketball team won the 2005 NAIA National Championship.

Notable people

Alumni
Bob Shearer, 1974, former president and COO of Shearer's Foods
Louis Zacharilla, 1978, co-founder of the Intelligent Community Forum
Michael Skindell, 1983, former assistant attorney general of Ohio and State Representative for the 13th House District of Ohio
Bishop Isaac Amani Massawe, 1988 and 1990, former Bishop for the Diocese of Moshi, Tanzania from 2007 to 2017 and current archbishop of Arusha, Tanzania
Christopher Remark, 1992 and 2008, CEO of Aultman Hospital
Jeff Dolan, 2001, first openly gay player in NAIA football. 
Penny Roberts, 2002, selected as America's Next Top Photographer by Tyra Banks
Brian Rogers, 2005, professional football player, professional mixed martial artist.
Rayshaun Kizer, 2006, gridiron football player
Joe Morgan, 2011, professional football player. Morgan transferred to Walsh in 2009.  
Ramona Hood, 2012, President and CEO of FedEx.
Ric Sayre, Elite Distance Runner.

Faculty and staff
Bob Huggins, basketball coach at Walsh from 1980 to 1983. He led the Cavaliers to a perfect 30–0 regular season. (They finished 34–1 overall).
Jim Dennison, football coach at Walsh from 1993 to 2012

References

External links
 

 
1960 establishments in Ohio
Buildings and structures in Stark County, Ohio
Education in Stark County, Ohio
Educational institutions established in 1960
Catholic universities and colleges in Ohio
Roman Catholic Diocese of Youngstown